The Congress of Canadian Women was a feminist organization created in March 1950 by the merger of several organizations, including the Housewives and Consumers Association. The Congress lobbied for women's equality including measures such as equal pay and public daycare. Rae Luckock was the organization's founding president. Former Labor-Progressive Party Member of Parliament Dorise Nielsen was also involved in founding the organization. The CCW was largely led by women associated with the communist Labor-Progressive Party and was also involved with the peace movement during the Cold War, facilitating meetings between people from the Soviet Union and Canadians, by inviting them to visit Canada.

References

Feminist organizations in Canada
Political movements in Canada
Organizations established in 1950